Amplifier Worship is the second album by Japanese band Boris.

Excluding the "one-long-song" albums, this is one of only two Boris full-lengths to have vocals on every song (the other being 2008's Smile), and the first time that Takeshi performed lead vocals for the band (although Atsuo performs lead vocals on "Huge"). "Vomitself" was written and laid down separately at Sound Square while the other four songs were recorded at Sound Crew. According to Japanese production company FoodUnited, videos were shot for "Hama" and "Kuruimizu" but were not released to the public.

The Southern Lord vinyl issue features new artwork but uses the same crossfading despite the track order change and the inability to segue across sides; these issues are solved either with new crossfades (the two songs on side A) or cut offs (the rest of the sides).

Studio reworkings of "Huge" and "Vomitself" appear on their collaborative album with Merzbow, Gensho.

Track listing
Some of the track titles were originally released in Japanese (2, 3, and 4)

Personnel
 Wata - guitar, effects and electronics
 Takeshi - vocals, bass and electronics
 Atsuo - vocals, drums, cymbal and electronic drums
 Osamu Seino - engineer (tracks 1 to 4)
 Eiji Hashizume - engineer (track 5)
 Fangs Anal Satan - artwork

Pressing history

References

External links
 

Boris (band) albums
Southern Lord Records albums
1998 albums